Singam  may refer to:

Film
 Singam (film series), a series of Tamil films created by Hari and starring Suriya
 Singam, a 2010 film
 Singam II, a 2013 film
 Si3 (film), a 2017 film
 Singam 123, a 2015 Telugu film

Names
 Singam (name), a surname or given name (including a list of people with the name)

See also